Brenda Patricia Matthews (born 19 February 1949, in Auckland) is a former female track and field sprinter and hurdler from New Zealand. She represented her native country at the 1972 Summer Olympics in Munich, West Germany.

External links
 

1949 births
Living people
New Zealand female sprinters
New Zealand female hurdlers
Athletes (track and field) at the 1966 British Empire and Commonwealth Games
Athletes (track and field) at the 1972 Summer Olympics
Athletes (track and field) at the 1974 British Commonwealth Games
Olympic athletes of New Zealand
Athletes from Auckland
People educated at Kelston Girls' College
Commonwealth Games competitors for New Zealand